Lyndon R. Carlson, Sr. (born April 18, 1940) is an American politician and a former member of the Minnesota House of Representatives. A member of the Minnesota Democratic–Farmer–Labor Party (DFL), he last represented District 45A, which included portions of Hennepin County in the Twin Cities metropolitan area. He is also a retired teacher and coach, having taught at Henry High School in Minneapolis for many years.

Education
Carlson graduated from Minnesota State University, Mankato, then named Mankato State College, in 1964 with a B.S. in education and social studies, and also attended graduate school there and at St. Thomas College in Saint Paul.

Minnesota House of Representatives
Carlson was first elected to the House in 1972 and has been reelected every two years since. He represented the old District 44A before the 1982 legislative redistricting, and the old District 46B until the 2002 legislative redistricting. On January 3, 2017, he became both the longest-serving Minnesota legislator and the longest-serving member of the Minnesota House of Representatives. He was chair of the Finance Committee from 2007 to 2010, assistant minority leader from 1999 to 2002, and chair of the Education Committee from 1981 to 1984 and from 1987 to 1997. He also served on the Legislative Citizens Commission on Minnesota Resources and on the Midwest Higher Education Commission.

References

External links 

 Rep. Carlson Web Page
 Minnesota Public Radio Votetracker: Rep. Lyndon Carlson
 Project Votesmart - Rep. Lyndon Carlson Profile
 Lyndon Carlson Campaign Web Site

1940 births
Living people
Politicians from Minneapolis
American Congregationalists
Democratic Party members of the Minnesota House of Representatives
21st-century American politicians
Minnesota State University, Mankato alumni
People from Crystal, Minnesota
20th-century American politicians
Schoolteachers from Minnesota
20th-century American educators